The McKenzie Lectures are a series of annual public lectures delivered by "a distinguished scholar on the history of the book, scholarly editing, or bibliography and the sociology of texts". The lectures are held in Oxford at the Centre for the Study of the Book (Bodleian Libraries). The series was inaugurated in 1996, in honour of Donald Francis McKenzie (1931–1999), upon his retirement as Professor of Bibliography and Textual Criticism, University of Oxford.

Lectures 
 1996 David McKitterick: Printers in the Marketplace
 1997 Roger Chartier: Foucault’s Chiasmus: Authorship between Science and Literature
 1998 Joseph Viscomi: Blake’s Graphic Imagination: the Technical and Aesthetic Origins of Blake’s Illuminated Books
 1999 Lawrence Rainey: The Cultural Economy of Modernism
 2000 Harold Love: The Intellectual Heritage of Donald Francis McKenzie
 2001 Patricia Clements and Isobel Grundy: Women’s Literary History by Electronic Means. the creation and communication of meaning in the Orlando Project
 2002 Paul Needham: The Discovery and Invention of the Gutenberg Bible
 2003 Laurel Brake:  'Daily Calendars of Roguery and Woe’. The Politics of Print in 19th-century Britain
 2004 Graham Shaw: In or Out? — South Asia and a Global History of the Book
 2005 John Barnard: Keats and Posterity: Manuscript, Print, and Readers
 2006 Gary Taylor: The Man Who Made Shakespeare. England’s First Literary Publisher
 2007 Robert Darnton: Bohemians before Bohemianism: Grub Street Libertines in Paris and London 1770–1789 — Keats and Posterity; Manuscript, Print, and Readers
 2008 : Gandhi’s Printing Press: Print Cultures in the Indian Ocean
 2009 Jerome McGann: Philology in a New Key: Information Technology and the Transmission of Culture
 2010 Henry Woudhuysen: A. W. Pollard (1859–1944): Friends and Fine Printing
 2011 Paul Eggert: Brought to Book: Book History and the Idea of Literature
 2012 John B. Thompson: Merchants of Culture
 2013 Xu Bing: The Sort of Artist I Am
 2014 William Noel: Bibliography in Bits: the study of books in the twenty-first century
 2015 Sheldon Pollock: Editing in India: the First 1500 years
 2016 : Authorship in Transnational Perspective
 2017 Peter Kornicki: Publish and Perish in Japan: Why manuscripts continued to circulate in the age of print 
 2019 Kate Nation: Learning to Read: linking biology and culture via cognition 
 2020 Kathryn Sutherland, Dirk van Hulle, Peter McDonald; Richard Ovenden (Chair): McKenzie 25 years on: anniversaries, legacies, reflections
 2021 Francesca Orsini: The magazine and world literature

See also
 E. A. Lowe Lectures
 Lyell Lectures
 Panizzi Lectures
 Sandars Lectures

References

Donald Francis McKenzie; Oxford Index

History of books
History of literature
Lecture series at the University of Oxford
Textual criticism
Textual scholarship